Saint Barsabias (d. 342) was an abbot and missionary who was martyred in Persia.
His feast day is 20 October.

Monks of Ramsgate's account

The monks of St Augustine's Abbey, Ramsgate, in their Book of Saints (1921) wrote,

Butler's account

The hagiographer Alban Butler wrote,

See also
Martyrs of Persia under Shapur II

Notes

Sources

 
 

342 deaths
4th-century Christian martyrs
Christian abbots
Saints